Shiner is a city in Lavaca County, Texas, United States. The town was named after Henry B. Shiner, who donated  for a railroad right-of-way. As of the 2020 census, the city had a population of 2,127. Shiner was founded by German and Czech emigrants.

History
In 1885, a post office called Half Moon was opened at a trading post near the present site of Shiner. In 1887, Henry B. Shiner donated 250 acres for a depot and right-of-way for the San Antonio and Aransas Pass Railway, which bypassed Half Moon and was built through Henry B. Shiner's donated land. The town grew around these transportation facilities. The town initially called itself "New Half Moon", but in 1888, the town's name was changed to Shiner and the town was incorporated in 1890.

Czech and German immigrants soon became the dominant ethnic groups, and Shiner developed a cohesive Czech community that still heavily influences the town's culture. Ranching was an important part of the town's history.

Historically notable families of the area are the Wolters and Welhausen families, after whom the Edwin Wolters Memorial Museum and the Shiner Welhausen Park are named, respectively.

Shiner is the home of the Spoetzl Brewery, the oldest independent brewery in Texas. The brewery is most well known for producing Shiner Bock, a dark German/Czech-style beer that is now distributed in 49 states.

Shiner is also the home of the historic Kaspar Companies, one of the oldest continuously operating companies in America. Kaspar Companies is a holding company that currently consists of Ranch Hand Truck Accessories, Texas Precious Metals, and several other businesses.

Geography

Demographics

As of the 2020 United States census, 2,127 people, 798 households, and 589 families were residing in the city.

As of the census of 2000,  2,070 people, 882 households, and 572 families resided in the city. The population density was 849.9 people per square mile (327.6/km2). The 1,016 housing units had an average density of 417.1/sq mi (160.8/km2). The racial makeup of the city was 85.60% White, 10.87% African American, 0.05% Native American, 0.29% Asian, 1.93% from other races, and 1.26% from two or more races. Hispanics or Latinos of any race were 6.09% of the population.

Of the 882 households,  26.6% had children under 18 living with them, 51.1% were married couples living together, 10.7% had a female householder with no husband present, and 35.1% were not families. About 33.4% of all households were made up of individuals, and 22.9% had someone living alone who was 65 or older. The average household size was 2.25, and the average family size was 2.86.

In the city, the age distribution was 21.8% under 18, 5.4% from 18 to 24, 23.1% from 25 to 44, 20.9% from 45 to 64, and 28.7% who were 65  or older. The median age was 45 years. For every 100 females, there were 80.9 males. For every 100 females 18, and over, there were 74.9 males.

The median income for a household in the city was $28,205, and for a family was $40,250. Males had a median income of $28,167 versus $17,426 for females. The per capita income for the city was $16,942. About 7.4% of families and 11.5% of the population were below the poverty line, including 10.7% of those under 18 and 21.0% of those 65 or over.

Education
The City of Shiner is served by the Shiner Independent School District and home to the Shiner High School Comanches. The city is also served by Shiner Catholic School, which operates St. Paul High School and St. Ludmila Elementary School.

Climate

Media
Shiner's weekly newspaper, The Shiner Gazette, was established in 1892.

Notable people

 Jeremy Fikac (2001–2004), MLB pitcher for the San Diego Padres, Oakland Athletics, and Montreal Expos
 Logan Ondrusek (2010– ), MLB pitcher for the Cincinnati Reds and Baltimore Orioles
 Vic Roznovsky (1964–1969), MLB catcher for the Chicago Cubs, Baltimore Orioles, and Philadelphia Phillies
 Carroll Sembera (1965–1970), MLB pitcher for the Houston Astros and Montreal Expos
 Ross Youngs (1917–1926), MLB baseball player with the New York Giants and member of the Baseball Hall of Fame

References

External links

 
 Shiner Chamber of Commerce

Cities in Lavaca County, Texas
Cities in Texas